Edwin Clark (born 25 May 1927) is a Nigerian nationalist, Ijaw leader and politician from Delta State who worked with the administrations of military governor Samuel Ogbemudia and head of state, General Yakubu Gowon between 1966 and 1975. In 1966, he was a member of an advisory committee to the military governor of the Mid-Western Region province, David Ejoor and was appointed Federal Commissioner of Information in 1975.

Clark was an unofficial advisor to President Goodluck Jonathan. He is a philanthropist who founded the Edwin Clark Foundation and established a university in his hometown.

Life

Early life and education
Clark was born in Kiagbodo, in the Ijaw area of what is now Delta State. He attended primary and secondary schools at Effurun, Okrika and Afugbene before completing further studies at the Government Teacher Training College, which later became Delta State University, Abraka. Thereafter, Clark worked briefly as a school teacher before traveling abroad to earn a law degree.

The Nigerian poet J. P. Clark was his younger brother.

Politics
Clark's involvement in the political process began during the pre-independence period when he was elected as Councillor for Bomadi in 1953. Clark later joined National Council of Nigeria and the Cameroons (NCNC). While a student at Holborn College, he was active in the West African Students' Union.

After the military coup of January 1966, Clark was among a group of delegates from the Mid-West who opposed any ideas of confederation that were raised at an ad-hoc constitutional conference set up by Gowon in 1966. The delegation's mandate was Nigerian unity and when proposals of a loose federation were tabled, the region's delegates asked for adjournment. Clark was later appointed Midwestern Commissioner of Education and later, Finance. As commissioner for education, he was active in the establishment of a Mid-west College of Technology that became the foundation of the University of Benin.

During the second republic, he was a member of the national executive committee of the National Party of Nigeria (NPN) and was the treasurer of the party in Bendel State (now, in part, Delta State and previously the Mid-Western Region province). In 1983, he was an elected senator for three months at the twilight of the Shagari administration.

Beginning in 1996, Clark has been a self-described leader of the Ijaw nation. He supported the Ijaw ethnic group in Delta State during an ethnic crisis in Warri and has led Ijaw leadership delegations to meet political leaders.

Other achievements
He is the founder of Edwin Clark University which was established in 2015.

References

Nigerian politicians